Makino (written: 牧野 or 槙野) is a Japanese surname. Notable people with the surname include:

, Japanese singer
, Japanese daimyō
Fred Kinzaburo Makino (牧野 金三郎, 1877-1953), Japanese newspaper editor
, Japanese daimyō
, Japanese swimmer
Hiroshi Makino (born 1956), Japanese golfer
, Japanese musician
, Japanese footballer
, Japanese singer
, Japanese film director
, Japanese shogi player
, Japanese footballer
, Japanese daimyō
, A member of the Japanese group NiziU and former actress
, Japanese statesman
, Japanese daimyō
, Japanese daimyō
, Japanese footballer
, Japanese baseball player and coach
, Japanese footballer
, Japanese general
Shozo Makino (disambiguation), multiple people
, Japanese daimyō
, Japanese daimyō
, Japanese daimyō
, Japanese daimyō
, Japanese daimyō
, Japanese racing driver
, Japanese daimyō
, Japanese politician
, Japanese botanist
, Japanese footballer
, Japanese writer, critic and social activist
, Japanese actress, voice actress, singer and pianist
, Japanese sailor

Japanese-language surnames